The Morvan (historically Morvand from the Latin Murvinnum  590) is a mountainous massif lying just to the west of the Côte d'Or escarpment in the Bourgogne-Franche-Comté region, central-east France. It is a northerly extension of the Massif Central and is of Variscan age. It is composed of granites and basalts and formed a promontory extending northwards into the Jurassic sea.

It is the smallest mountain area in France in terms of landmass covered, as well as the lowest, with a maximum altitude of 901 metres (2,956 feet) at Haut-Folin.

Geography
The Morvan is located across the Côte-d'Or, Nièvre, Saône-et-Loire and Yonne departments in the Bourgogne-Franche-Comté region in central-east France.

At its heart nowadays is the protected area of Morvan Regional Natural Park (French: Parc naturel régional du Morvan).

Its main town is Château-Chinon, Nièvre on the D978 road between Nevers and Autun. Several of its valleys have been dammed to form reservoirs.

Music

The Morvan has a strong  musical tradition. It uses musical ideas from many other cultures and combines them to make its own.

See also
 Château-Chinon (Campagne)
 Château-Chinon (Ville)

References

External links
Internationally, Morvan is relatively unknown, so most information is in French.

Lormes.net, a place in the Morvan 
Description of The Morvan 
Parc du morvan and pollution sources 
Le Morvan 

Mountain ranges of Bourgogne-Franche-Comté